Oudomsay Airport (or Oudomxay Airport)  is an airport in Muang Xay, Laos .

Airlines and destinations

Airports in Laos
Buildings and structures in Oudomxay province